Plaxomicrus is a genus of longhorn beetles of the subfamily Lamiinae.

 Plaxomicrus ellipticus Thomson, 1857
 Plaxomicrus latus Gahan, 1901
 Plaxomicrus nigriventris Pu, 1991
 Plaxomicrus oberthuri Gahan, 1901
 Plaxomicrus pallidicolor Pic, 1912
 Plaxomicrus sikkimensis Breuning, 1956
 Plaxomicrus szetschuanus Breuning, 1956
 Plaxomicrus violaceomaculatus Pic, 1912

References

Astathini
Cerambycidae genera